The 1979 Stevenage Borough Council election took place on 3 May 1979. This was on the same day as other local elections. The entire council was up for election and the Labour Party retained control of the council.

Overall results

|-bgcolor=#F6F6F6
| colspan=2 style="text-align: right; margin-right: 1em" | Total
| style="text-align: right;" | 39
| colspan=5 |
| style="text-align: right;" | 41,336
| style="text-align: right;" | 
|-
|colspan="11" bgcolor=""|
|-
| style="background:"|
| colspan="10"| Labour hold

Ward results

Bandley Hill (3 seats)

Bedwell Plash (3 seats)

Chells (2 seats)

Longmeadow (3 seats)

Martins Wood (3 seats)

Mobbsbury (3 seats)

Monkswood (3 seats)

Old Stevenage (3 seats)

Pin Green (3 seats)

Roebuck (3 seats)

St Nicholas (3 seats)

Shephall (3 seats)

Symonds Green (3 seats)

Wellfield (1 seat)

References

1979
1979 English local elections
1970s in Hertfordshire